General Motors of Canada Company, commonly known as GM Canada, is the Canadian subsidiary of US-based company General Motors. It is headquartered in Oshawa, Ontario, Canada.

On November 26, 2018, GM announced the closure of its Oshawa plant, ending a century of automobile and related manufacturing operations in the city. On November 5, 2020, GM announced reopening of the Oshawa plant in January 2022 to produce GMC Sierra and Chevrolet Silverado trucks, hiring up to 2,500 workers.

History
GM Canada has historically been one of the largest and most powerful corporations in Canada, being listed as the third "largest" in 1975, and being comparable to several publicly-traded companies such as BCE, George Weston Limited, and Royal Bank of Canada.

McLaughlin and Buick

In 1907, the "McLaughlin Motor Car Company" was founded in Ontario by Samuel McLaughlin. The first year saw the sale of 154 McLaughlin cars.

McLaughlin and William C. Durant, respectively the biggest carriage builders in Canada and the United States, contracted for Durant's Buick to supply McLaughlin with power trains for 15 years. McLaughlin fitted the power trains to running gear, bodies, and chassis built by McLaughlin in Canada. The cars were branded McLaughlin until the end of the contract, thereafter branded McLaughlin-Buick between 1923 and 1942.

In 1908, Durant and McLaughlin started General Motors Holding Company after Durant exchanged $500,000 of Buick stock for $500,000 of McLaughlin Motor Co. stock. McLaughlin also exchanged his Buick stock for General Motors stock, and in 1910 was invited to be on the board of General Motors in Detroit.

Chevrolet
In 1915, Sam McLaughlin acquired the Chevrolet Car Company of Canada, which built Chevrolets in Oshawa with Chevrolet motors and McLaughlin bodies. In 1918, he merged his company with Chevrolet Canada under the name "General Motors of Canada Limited". McLaughlin was retained as president of the company, before becoming director and vice president of General Motors on the approval of Durant, who was then president of General Motors and owner of the Chevrolet Motor Co. The corporation moved people in 1918 after McLaughlin allied his company with the corporation unknown to Robert McLaughlin. The McLaughlins were given GM stocks for the propriertorship of the Canadian Company and $10,000,000 to build Walkerville and Canadian Products, but not ownership.

Between 1923 and 1942, McLaughlin's cars were branded McLaughlin-Buick. In 1942, when the production of automobiles was suspended for the Second Great War, the last McLaughlin-Buick was built. When production resumed, they were just "Buick".

1980s–present 

General Motors of Canada opened its new head office building on the shore of Lake Ontario in 1989. The building is a fixture on Highway 401 and usually displays an enormous picture of a new vehicle on its huge glass atrium. This is a rented structure of General Motors Corporation and today is called General Motors. General Motors of Canada built their first offices on Richmond street in Oshawa and had large General Motors of Canada signage from 1919. The McLaughlin plants were there and were resigned by the McLaughlin Family.

GM's Canadian Technical Centre opened in June 2001. It is primarily responsible for managing the design and validation of vehicles that are manufactured in Canada, though it supports many joint development efforts with GM operations in other countries.

The manufacturing plants located in Oshawa produced the Chevrolet from 1915, and today the Camaro and included the Chevrolet Truck Company of Canada 1919. Cadillac and LaSalle were built here too. The Oshawa plants have regularly garnered top quality ratings by J.D. Power. The Oshawa facility was ranked number 1 facility in overall quality in North and South America by J. D. Power. The Truck Plant was closed to give industry to Mexico, and reopen old Saturn Plants.

General Motors of Canada announced a naming rights deal for the General Motors Centre in Oshawa on October 5, 2006. The centre's main tenants are the Oshawa Generals junior hockey team, who were named for the company in 1937.

On April 27, 2009, GM Canada announced that it would cut over half of its Canadian jobs and close 40% of its Canadian dealerships by 2014 in response to its parent company's dire financial straits. Reducing its franchises in Canada from approximately 709 dealerships to about 470 across the country, after General Motors (US) bankruptcy. The Canadian Government sold its 12% of General Motors stock, purchased in 2009, in early 2015.

In 2021, GM announced that it will be converting its CAMI Automotive Plant into a large-scale commercial electric vehicle manufacturing plant to build the BrightDrop EV600, beginning in April 2022.

With the onset of the COVID-19 pandemic, GM Canada committed to the Government of Canada the production of 10 million face masks at cost for the Public Health Agency of Canada. Beginning production on May 26, 2020, at its Oshawa facility, GM Canada fulfilled its commitment on April 8, 2021.

2008 Canadian Auto Workers bargaining
General Motors and the Canadian Auto Workers (CAW) union reached a tentative agreement on a new collective bargaining contract on May 15, 2008, a full four months before the existing contract was due to expire. As part of the agreement, GM pledged to maintain production at the Oshawa, Ontario pickup truck plant and made other production commitments.

On June 3, 2008, less than three weeks after ratification of the new contract, GM announced that, due to soaring gasoline prices and plummeting truck sales, it would close four additional truck and SUV plants, including the Oshawa pickup plant.

In response, the CAW organized a blockade of the GM of Canada headquarters in Oshawa. The blockade was ended by an Ontario Superior Court order, after 12 days. Further discussions between GM and the CAW resulted in an agreement to compensate workers at the truck plant and additional product commitments for the Oshawa car assembly plant.

Manufacturing facilities

Former manufacturing facilities

Canadian Technical Centre

Oshawa Campus

The "Canadian Technical Centre Oshawa Campus" is GM's second largest automotive software engineering and development cluster in North America and third in the world.

Located in Oshawa, Ontario, next to the plant which builds midsize cars, the CTC is where the company conducts much of its engineering and software work.

The CTC in Oshawa opened in 2001 and represented a significant growth in the scope of engineering done in Canada by GM. Previously, the engineering team in Oshawa focused on making improvements to the vehicles currently in production, and the team was less than 50 engineers. After three years of growth and the construction of the CREC building, the organization grew to over 500, and work was focused on designing future products such as the next-generation Chevrolet Equinox, built in Ingersoll, Ontario, as well as supporting the highly rated car and truck plants alongside CREC in Oshawa. In addition, teams within CREC work in the areas of alternative fuels, hybrids, and fuel cell vehicles. In 2008, CREC's focus began changing, and its size reducing, due to contractions in GM's workforce in general, and the rise in the Canadian dollar. Over the past year, the engineering staff has been cut dramatically, several times, in response to the shift in focus from mainstream vehicle development to advanced technology work (ATW). The total reduction reached more than 60% in June 2009, leaving a workforce of about 150 concentrated in various areas of ATW and heavily linked with Canadian government-supported programs such as the Automotive Innovation Network (AIN).

Markham Campus 
The "Automotive Software Development Centre" in Markham, Ontario, is GM Canada's expansion of its Oshawa campus. It is located at the former Canadian head office site of American Express.

Announced in 2016 and opened in 2017, the facility is meant to support work done on GM’s advanced driver-assistance features, its fully autonomous vehicle program, and infotainment system design.

Models produced in Canada

Models formerly produced in Canada

Models exclusive to Canada

See also

 General Motors
 Oshawa – Detailed history of the early years of GM in Canada.
 Samuel McLaughlin – The first President of GM Canada
 Final Offer – documentary film that shows the 1984 contract negotiations
 Foreign ownership of companies of Canada
 Canadian Military Pattern truck – An important part of GM Canada's contribution to the war effort in World War II
 Oshawa Generals and General Motors Centre

References

GMC to add minivan, GM to discontinue others.
J.D. Power website

External links

 
 Timeline of General Motors of Canada history
 A history of General motors in Canada
 CTV news: GM Canada says 245 dealerships getting axed

 
Car manufacturers of Canada
Canadian brands
Companies based in Oshawa
Canadian subsidiaries of foreign companies